Brutal Youth is an album by Elvis Costello, released in 1994.  This album contains the first recordings Costello made with his band the Attractions since Blood and Chocolate (1986).  About half the album features a band consisting of Costello (guitar), Steve Nieve (keyboards) and Pete Thomas (drums) with Nick Lowe (not a member of the Attractions) on bass. Costello himself plays bass on two tracks (2 and 8), and the complete Attractions line-up (Nieve, Pete Thomas and Bruce Thomas on bass) appears with Costello on tracks 3, 4, 6, 9 and 10.

Brutal Youth was the third, and most recent of Costello's albums, to peak at number two in the UK Albums Chart, following on from Armed Forces (1979) and Get Happy!! (1980).

Content
Costello began writing the material for Brutal Youth after writing a set of pop punk songs for Wendy James' 1993 album Now Ain't the Time for Your Tears. Under the working title Idiophone (named for an instrument "made of naturally sonorous material"), Costello began recording these songs at Pathway Studios with former Attractions drummer Pete Thomas; he explained in a 1994 interview, "To be honest with you, I have to admit that I had decided to do this record all by myself. But then I had to face this reality: I'll never be a drummer. So I called Pete." Ultimately, Costello found the minimalist sound at Pathway, where he recorded My Aim Is True, to be limiting, moving recording to Olympic Studios.

Upon arriving at Olympic, Costello recruited another ex-Attraction, keyboardist Steve Nieve, as well as former producer Nick Lowe on bass guitar. Though this arrangement, informally nicknamed "the Distractions", performed on a significant portion of the album, Lowe bowed out on tracks that he felt required a more melodic and complex style of playing than he could provide. At the urging of producer Mitchell Froom, who had been a fan of the Attractions, Costello recruited the final missing Attraction, Bruce Thomas, who had worked on other records with Froom at the time. Thomas and Costello had the most fraught relationship of all the former bandmates, making Costello initially hesitant to make the call:

Although only five songs on the album feature the full Attractions line-up, Brutal Youth was marketed as an Attractions reunion album, Costello sought to dispel notions that the album was a retro pastiche and that the reunion was a bid for commercial relevance. He commented, "It was a lazy way out — I think everybody at the company recognises that now. We were going through the beginnings of the recent upheaval, the corporate insanity at Warners, which affected everything at the company. It gave the troops of the company much less leeway to be creative. Therefore they grabbed hold of the one thing they saw as a saleable feature, which was, hey, the band is back, and they're rockin'! It's a bit of a simplification."

Critical reception
Trouser Press wrote: "Throughout, deft instrumental touches, superb singing and the easy confidence of a still-competitive athlete returning to the scene of his greatest triumph make this another effortless win." In The Village Voices annual Pazz & Jop critics poll for the year's best albums, Brutal Youth finished at #31.

It was among the six Costello albums featured in the book 1001 Albums You Must Hear Before You Die.

Track listing
All songs by Declan MacManus unless otherwise indicated.

 "Pony St." – 3:25
 "Kinder Murder" – 3:25
 "13 Steps Lead Down" – 3:16
 "This Is Hell" – 4:27
 "Clown Strike" – 4:05
 "You Tripped at Every Step" – 4:12
 "Still Too Soon to Know" – 2:19
 "20% Amnesia" – 3:26
 "Sulky Girl" – 5:07
 "London's Brilliant Parade" – 4:23
 "My Science Fiction Twin" – 4:10
 "Rocking Horse Road" – 4:03
 "Just About Glad" – 3:14
 "All the Rage" – 3:52
 "Favourite Hour" – 3:31

Bonus disc (2002 Rhino)
 "Life Shrinks" – 3:37
 "Favourite Hour" (Church Studios Version) – 3:32
 "This Is Hell" (Church Studios Version) – 4:10
 "Idiophone" – 1:58
 "Abandon Words" – 2:55
 "Poisoned Letter" – 3:48
 "A Drunken Man's Praise of Sobriety" (MacManus, William Butler Yeats) – 1:08
 "Pony St." (Bonaparte Rooms Version) – 3:36
 "Just About Glad" (Bonaparte Rooms Version) – 3:41
 "Clown Strike" (Bonaparte Rooms Version) – 4:19
 "Rocking Horse Road" (Demo) – 3:18
 "13 Steps Lead Down" (Demo) – 2:07
 "All the Rage" (Demo) – 3:38
 "Sulky Girl" (Demo) – 4:31
 "You Tripped at Every Step" (Church Studios Version) – 3:25

B-sides (available on the 13 Steps Lead Down EP)
 "Puppet Girl"
"Basement Kiss"
"We Despise You"

"London's Brilliant Parade (EP)"
"London's Brilliant Parade"
"Sweet Dreams"
"The Loved Ones"
"From Head to Toe"

Personnel
Elvis Costello – guitar, vocals, piano on 15; bass on 2 and 8
The Attractions
Steve Nieve – organ, piano, harmonium
Bruce Thomas – bass on 3, 4, 6, 9-10
Pete Thomas – drums, percussion
with:
Nick Lowe – bass on 1, 5, 7, 11-14

Charts
Album

Singles and EP

Cultural depictions

Elvis Costello appeared on "People's Choice", a 1994 episode of The Larry Sanders Show, playing himself and promoting Brutal Youth; he and the Attractions play a live version of "13 Steps Lead Down."

References

External links
 

Elvis Costello albums
1994 albums
Albums produced by Mitchell Froom
Rhino Records albums
Warner Records albums